Leslie Joseph Rogers (25 June 1896 – 4 August 1916, born Leslie Joseph Collins) was an Australian rules footballer who played with Essendon in the Victorian Football League (VFL).

Rogers, a wingman, came from Yarraville originally and played only three games at Essendon before joining the Army.

As a Private, Rogers fought on the Western Front with the 23rd Battalion and was killed in action.

See also
 List of Victorian Football League players who died in active service

Footnotes

1896 births
1916 deaths
Essendon Football Club players
Yarraville Football Club players
Australian rules footballers from Victoria (Australia)
Australian military personnel killed in World War I